Eleventh He Reaches London were an Australian five-piece post-hardcore band formed in December 1999 in Perth as Our Lasting Loss. They changed their name in late 2002 and released three studio albums, The Good Fight for Harmony (December 2005), Hollow Be My Name  (March 2009) and Bānhūs (October 2013). They disbanded in 2016.

History

1999-2004: Formation
Eleventh He Reaches London started in December 1999 as the quartet, Our Lasting Loss, with Mark Donaldson on drums, Ian Lenton on lead vocals and guitar, Alex Lucas on bass guitar and Jayden Worts on lead guitar; all were aged 17. 

In 2001 their track, "You Left Me at the Crossroads Like Val Kilmer in Willow", appeared on a various artists' compilation album, Left of Centre 2. It was recorded with Allen Smith producing, at Bergerk! Studios, and mixed and mastered by Rob Swire of Pendulum. Shortly after Lucas left the band and was replaced by Brad Rowland on bass guitar.

They changed their name in late 2002, which comes from an epic poem, Don Juan, by Lord Byron: in its eleventh chapter, the protagonist reaches London. In late 2003 the band released its first extended play, Diving for Treacher. Smith produced, mixed and mastered the three-track EP, their line-up changed again with Craig McElhinney replacing Rowland and the addition of Jeremy Martin, as their third guitarist, adding a new dimension to its sound.

During 2004 Eleventh He Reaches London played supported other artists, Against Me!, Shai Hulud and The Nation Blue. In October of that year they completed four shows in Melbourne. Martin described the group's style in December 2005:
Collectively, we listen to a very diverse range of music, and I think our music reflects this. We all like many of the same artists, but each of us have quite different tastes. All of us enjoy listening to and creating music that is dramatic, and that creates a strong sense of mood... We don't fit neatly into any one scene within Perth, and we are more than happy about this. While some may see it as a disadvantage, for us it means we have the pleasure of performing alongside artists playing a diverse range of styles. Playing with the same bands and to the same crowd week in, week out tends to get tedious, and removes any element of surprise a gig may have. It removes the challenge of attempting to win over punters that haven't seen or heard you before.

2005-2007: The Good Fight for Harmony 
In early 2005, the band returned to Bergerk! Studios with Allen Smith to record their first studio album. The group performed at the West Australian Music Industry Awards Festival and RTRFM's In the Pines, as well as being the only main stage support act on the Perth leg of Taste of Chaos, where they performed to a sold-out Robinson Pavilion with the Used, Killswitch Engage, Funeral for a Friend, Story of the Year and Rise Against. After six months in the recording studio, with the album mastered by Shaun O'Callaghan at Studio Couch, The Good Fight for Harmony was released on 14 December 2005. It reached the top of the local charts, almost selling out of its first pressing within a month and a half. "Say You See Why So" received airplay on Triple J and local radio.

In 2006 Eleventh He Reaches London started writing for a second album. The band performed as part of the WAMi Festival and won its first WAMi Award (for 'Favourite Newcomer'). The band completed a short Western Australia tour with Gyroscope, supported Les Savy Fav, returned to Melbourne to promote The Good Fight For Harmony, and also supported Coheed and Cambria on their first Australian tour. In 2007, they band played support for Converge, ISIS and Funeral for a Friend on the Perth leg of their respective Australian tours and won a second WAMi Award ('Best Hardcore/Punk Act'). The band received a grant from the Department of Culture and Arts (Western Australia) to assist in the production of the second album.

2008-2011 : Hollow be my Name
In 2008 Eleventh He Reaches London released the lead track (on-line), "For the Commonwealth and the Queen", ahead of their second album, Hollow be my Name. 

In June that year, bass guitarist McElhinney left the band to pursue a solo project and explore other musical interests. The band signed with Good Cop Bad Cop Records in July 2008, which re-released The Good Fight for Harmony on 16 August 2008. As a result of delay in the band's second album due to line-up changes (with a February 2009 release date) their new record label released a 7" single, "Girt by Piss", on 25 October 2008. Also in October, the band introduced its replacement for McElhinney, Luke Pollard, and undertook a national tour in support of the new single. The B-side of the single, "Hill of Grace", was nominated for the 2008 WAM Song of the Year competition.

The band's second album, Hollow Be My Name, was released on 28 March 2009 on Good Cop Bad Cop Records. Thematically, the album is dark and introspective; Martin explained:

2012-2016: Bānhūs and disbandment

In April 2012 the band joined Hobbledehoy Record Co. for vinyl reissues of their previous material. 

Their third album, Bānhūs, was released through that label on 4 October 2013. The group disbanded in 2016.

Members
 Mark Donaldson – drums (1999–2016)
 Ian Lenton – lead vocals, guitar (1999–2016)
 Alex Lucas – bass guitar (1999–2001)
 Jayden Worts – lead guitar (1999–2016)
 Brad Rowland – bass guitar (2001–03)
 Jeremy Martin – lead guitar (2003–16)
 Craig McElhinney – bass guitar (2003–08)
 Luke Pollard – bass guitar (2008–16)

Discography

Studio albums

Awards and nominations

WAM Song of the Year
The WAM Song of the Year was formed by the  Western Australian Rock Music Industry Association Inc. (WARMIA) in 1985, with its main aim to develop and run annual awards recognising achievements within the music industry in Western Australia.

 (wins only)
|-
| 2013
| "Body Unbind"
| Rock Song of the Year
| 
|-

West Australian Music Awards
The West Australian Music Industry Awards (WAMIs) are annual awards presented to the local contemporary music industry, put on annually by the Western Australian Music Industry Association Inc (WAM).

|-
| 2006
| Eleventh He Reaches London
| Favourite Newcomer 
| 
|-
| 2007
| Eleventh He Reaches London
| Best Hardcore/Punk Act 
| 
|-
| 2010
| Eleventh He Reaches London
| Best Hard Rock / Metal Act 
| 
|-
| 2011
| Eleventh He Reaches London
| Best Hard Rock / Metal Act 
| 
|-

References

External links 
 
 
 

Australian indie rock groups
Western Australian musical groups
Musical groups established in 1999
Musical groups disestablished in 2016